The R580 road is a regional road in County Cork, Ireland. It travels from the R576 road at Kanturk to the N20 at Buttevant.

References

Regional roads in the Republic of Ireland
Roads in County Cork